Johann Jakob Stähelin (1 May 1797, in Basel – 27 August 1875, in Langenbruck) was a Swiss theologian, who specialized in Old Testament studies.

From 1817 to 1821 he studied theology at the University of Tübingen. In 1823 he received his PhD and subsequently worked as a lecturer at the University of Basel. In 1829 he became an associate professor at Basel, where in 1835 he was named a full professor of Old Testament studies. In 1842 he obtained his doctorate of divinity, and in 1846 was appointed university rector.

Principal works 
 Kritische Untersuchungen über die Genesis, 1830 – Critical investigations on the biblical Genesis.
 Kritische Untersuchungen über die biblische Chronik, 1830 – Critical investigations on the biblical Chronicles.
 Kritische Untersuchungen über den Pentateuch, die Bucher Josua, Richter, Samuels und der Könige, 1843 – Critical investigations on the Pentateuch, the Books of Joshua, Judges, Samuel and Kings.
 Die messianischen Weissagungen des Alten Testaments in ihrer Entstehung, Entwicklung und Ausbildung : mit Berücksichtigung der hauptsächlichsten neutestamentlichen Citate, 1847 – The messianic prophecies of the Old Testament.
 Specielle Einleitung in die kanonischen Bücher des Alten Testaments, 1862 – Introduction to the canonical books of the Old Testament.

References 

1797 births
1875 deaths
People from Basel-Stadt
Academic staff of the University of Basel
University of Tübingen alumni
Swiss Protestant theologians